Nachon Nsingi Nguidi (born 24 April 2001) is a Belgian professional footballer who plays as a forward for OH Leuven in the Belgian First Division A.

Career
On 19 May 2018, Nsingi moved to OH Leuven from the youth academy of Crossing Schaerbeek. He made his debut for OH Leuven on 23 July 2022 in the opening match of the team's 2022–23 season away to Kortrijk, after having been awarded his first professional contract just a few days prior.

Personal life
Born in Belgium, Nsingi is of DR Congolese descent.

References 

2001 births
Living people
Belgian footballers
Belgian sportspeople of Democratic Republic of the Congo descent
Association football forwards
Oud-Heverlee Leuven players
Belgian Pro League players